This is a list of flag bearers who have represented the Cook Islands at the Olympics.

Flag bearers carry the national flag of their country at the opening ceremony of the Olympic Games.

See also
Cook Islands at the Olympics

References

Flag bearers
Cook Islands
Olympic flagbearers